Anjukottai is a village in northern Ramnad district, Tamil Nadu, India,  from Tiruvadanai; and  from Thondi. It includes seven small villages: Vaniyenthal, Melavayal, Pottakottai, Manathadal, Karaiyakottai, Chinna Anjukottai and Periya Anjukottai.

Hindus (the majority), Muslims and Christians live there. The village has one mosque, six churches and more than 15 temples. Most of the people are farmers and businessmen.

The Maravar community was the largest.

There are schools, hospitals, a panchayath union, post office, and bus stand. It is back-bone and heart to Thiruvadanai Taluka. Once the Thiruvadanai Taluka was managed by a person from this village who was the chairman Mr. A.T.M.Ramanathan ambalam. After ATMR in 2011 local body election Mrs. Muniyammal Rajendran who belonged to Vaniyenthal village in Anjukottai was selected as Chairman of the Thiruvadanai union. She was the first AIADMK Chairman in Thiruvadanai union .

Population

Total Households 704   
Working Population 1406

External links
 https://web.archive.org/web/20110721222112/http://www.mark-group.info/
 http://www.mark-group.info/MS.html

Villages in Ramanathapuram district